The Battle of Zealand Point was a naval battle of the English Wars and the Gunboat War. Ships of the Danish and British navies fought off Zealand Point on 22 March 1808; the battle was a British victory. Peter Willemoes was among the Danish casualties,

Prelude
The Danish ship of the line HDMS Prinds Christian Frederik was stationed in Kristiansand, Norway from 7 August 1807, patrolling waters between Norway and Denmark where Britain had imposed a blockade. In February 1808, Prins Christian Frederik pursued the British ship  into hiding. While this was going on Prins Christian Frederik became frozen in at Fredericksværn, near Kristiansand. She therefore did not set sail for Denmark until 4 March.

By the time Prins Christian Frederik reached Denmark, epidemic typhus had broken out among her crew. Ice in the Danish harbours prevented her from docking, and crew were replaced over the ice. On 17 March morale deteriorated further when news arrived that King Christian had died. She was ordered into the Great Belt (Storebælt) strait to provide cover for a crossing of a French army corps consisting of Spanish soldiers ordered by Jean Baptiste Jules Bernadotte (later King of Sweden) to attack Skåne. Having been alerted to the Danish plan, the British ships give chase. The British ships intended to outmanoeuvre, corner, and overpower Prins Christian Frederik; Captain Carl Jessen, after conferring with his officers, decided to take a stand in order to gain enough of a tactical advantage to move into familiar waters and within the protective range of the cannon at Kronborg.

On Friday 18 March 1808 the crew of HMS Stately was employed cutting passages through the sea ice from their Swedish anchorage to allow Stately and Nassau to go to sea. The smaller ships patrolled the northern approaches to the Great Belt and the Øresund, within sight of the squadron or separately, investigating any strange sail. Quebec and Lynx were in company late on 21 March, then parted company early on 22nd before Quebec identified Prins Christian Frederik near Sejerø. Lynx, and later , joined with Quebec in Sejerø Bay.

Course

In the hours before the battle Prins Christian Frederik was within sight of Quebec and Lynx. At 2 [pm] the sloop, Falcon, who recorded the signal from Quebec "Danish Line-of-battle-ship to windward", joined them and cleared for action. During the afternoon the Danish ship had reversed course and sailed northward round the reef at the west of Sjællands Odde (that long tongue of land at the northwest of Zealand), and was now headed eastward again, to the north of the land.
Shortly after 4 [pm] Stately and Nassau were sighted to the North East, and the signal, "inforced with a (signal) gun", of the presence of the enemy led to all ships making "all sail, in chace".

Falcon and Nassaus logs record that at 7:50pm Prinds Christian Frederik fired the first shots when she fired  her stern chasers at Nassau, the foremost of her pursuers. By 8:05pm Nassau had drawn level and began returning broadsides, but forty minutes later she was in danger of blocking Statelys field of fire. Nassau made more sail and moved ahead out of the way as Stately entered the fray. Action continued with the two British ships-of-the-line alternating their attacks until Prinds Christian Frederik struck.

Throughout the morning of 23 March the squadron's boats transported prisoners, and the ships' companies knotted, spliced, and ran new rigging. At noon, orders were sent to set fire to Prinds Christian Frederick as soon as all the wounded had been removed. The fire was set between 7:30 and 8:00pm and Prinds Christian Frederik blew up shortly before 9:00 pm.

Stately had four men killed, and 31 officers and men wounded. Nassau lost one man killed, 17 officers and men wounded, and one man missing. Prins Christian Frederik lost 55 men killed and 88 men wounded. In 1847 the Admiralty awarded the Naval General Service Medal with clasps "Stately 22 March 1808" and "Nassau 22 March 1808" to any still surviving crew members of those vessels that chose to claim them.

Consequences and commemoration
Prins Christian Frederik was the last of the Danish ships of the line during the Napoleonic Wars.

Peter Willemoes and the other Danish casualties were after the battle buried in a communal grave at  Odden churchyard, near the scene of the Battle of Zealand Point, where their gravestone can still be seen. A monument commemorating the battle and the Danish casualties was also erected in the churchyard. It consists of a Neoclassical column featuring a plaque with an incidental poem by N.F.S. Grundtvig' ('De snekker de mødtes i kvæld på hav). A commemorative stone with a relief of a crowned anchor and an inscription has been erected on the beach.

Odsherred Museum hosts a small display about the battle. It includes the anchor. ,a canon and a number of other artefacts from Prinds Christian Frederik''. A model of this ship hangs in Odden Church.

Christian Mølsted has painted a somewhat romanticised scene from the battle in which Willemoes is dying in the arms of second in command C. A. Rothe. It exists in two versions, one in Museum Vestfyn (1901) and one in the Frederiksborg Museum in Hillerød.

Gallery

Notes

References

External links

Balsved's Danish Naval History  This website offers seven references in Danish for the details of the battle
Individual record cards in Danish for many ships of the Danish Royal Navy can  be found at skibregister (den sorte registrand) - There is also access to all the coded sources 
The Royal Danish Naval Museum website at which details, drawings and models may be available.  For individual ships already listed, including Prinds Christian Frederick, see here.

Zealand Point
Zealand Point
1808 in Denmark
March 1808 events